James, Jim, Jimmy or Jimmie Lyons may refer to:

Arts and entertainment
James L. Lyons (1916–1994), founder of the Monterey Jazz Festival
James Lyons (film editor) (1960–2007), American film editor and actor
Jimmy Lyons (James Lyons, 1931–1986), alto saxophone player

Politics
James Lyons (Upper Canada politician), merchant and political figure in Upper Canada
James Lyons (Virginia politician) (1801–1882), Confederate politician
James Lyons (Queensland politician) (1842–1915), member of the Queensland Legislative Assembly
James E. Lyons (politician) (1857–1943), American politician
James Lyons (New South Wales politician) (1875–1955), member of the New South Wales Legislative Council
James W. Lyons (1878–1947), Canadian politician
James J. Lyons (1890–1966), American politician
James J. Lyons Jr., Massachusetts politician

Others
James Alexander Lyons (1861–1920), American accountancy author and publisher
James Lyons (admiral) (1927–2018), US Navy admiral, former Commander-in-Chief, Pacific Fleet
James E. Lyons (academic) (born 1943), American academic administrator
James Lyons (lawyer) (born 1947), American lawyer, figure in the Whitewater controversy and former federal judicial nominee
James R. Lyons, plastic surgeon and author
Jim Lyons (footballer) (1876–1934), Australian rules footballer
Jimmie Lyons (1889–1961), American baseball player

See also
James Lyon (disambiguation)